Yassine Guenichi (born 3 April 1995) is a Tunisian para-athlete who specializes in shot put. He represented Tunisia at the 2020 Summer Paralympics.

Career
Guenichi represented Tunisia in the men's shot put F36 event at the 2020 Summer Paralympics and won a silver medal.

References

1995 births
Living people
Paralympic athletes of Tunisia
Medalists at the World Para Athletics Championships
Athletes (track and field) at the 2020 Summer Paralympics
Medalists at the 2020 Summer Paralympics
Paralympic silver medalists for Tunisia
Paralympic medalists in athletics (track and field)
Tunisian male shot putters
21st-century Tunisian people